Green Lanes may refer to:
A green lane (road), a type of road, usually an unpaved rural route.
Green Lanes (London), a major road running through north London
Harringay, a neighbourhood in the London Borough of Haringey sometimes informally referred to as 'Green Lanes' or 'Harringay Green Lanes' because of the railway station.
For other uses, see also Green Lane (disambiguation)